Moxaverine has been used in therapy based on the direct vasodilatory effect of the drug, a phosphodiesterase inhibitor, and on its influence on the rheological properties of red blood cells.

Moxaverine hydrochloride (Kollateral forte®, Ursapharm. Saarbrücken, Germany) has been shown to increase ocular blood flow in patients with age-related macular degeneration, primary open angle glaucoma, and to increase choroidal and retrobulbar blood flow in elderly patients with eye diseases associated with hypo-perfusion. The ocular efficacy of moxaverine has been explored in the clinic.

References 

Antispasmodics
Benzylisoquinolines
Phenol ethers
Phosphodiesterase inhibitors